The Northwest District is one of the 35 districts of the Lutheran Church–Missouri Synod (LCMS), and encompasses the states of Alaska, Idaho, Oregon and Washington; one Idaho congregation is in the Montana District. The Northwest District includes approximately 267 congregations and missions, subdivided into 25 circuits, as well as 93 preschools, 31 elementary schools and 4 high schools
. Baptized membership in district congregations is approximately 65,461.

The Northwest District was formed as the Oregon and Washington District in 1899 when the California and Oregon District was divided, also creating the California and Nevada District; the name was changed to the Northwest District in 1948. District offices are located in Portland, Oregon.  The Rev. Paul Linnemann became the district president in 2009.

Concordia University in Portland, part of the LCMS' Concordia University System, was located within the district.  It closed in Spring of 2020.

Presidents
Rev. Henry August Carl Paul, 1899–1903
Rev. W. Lüssenhop, 1903–06
Rev. W. H. Behrens, 1906–09
Rev. Ludwig Frederick Emil Stuebe, 1909–18
Rev. Johann Adam Rimbach, 1918–21
Rev. Weert J. Janssen, 1921–36
Rev. Frederick Max Leopold Nitz, 1936–48
Rev. Carl H. Bensene, 1948–70
Rev. Emil G. Jaech, 1970–82
Rev. Erhart L. Bauer, 1982–94
Rev. Dr. Warren W. Schumacher, 1994–2009
Rev. Paul Linnemann, 2009–present

References

External links
Northwest District web site
LCMS: Northwest District
LCMS Congregation Directory
[https://books.google.com/books?id=GtK4rcek_sQC&pg=RA1-PA1 Synodal-Bericht des California und Oregon Distrikts der Deutschen Evang.-Luth. Synode von Missouri, Ohio und Andern Staaten] (1887–1898) - Google Books
Synodal-Bericht des Oregon- und Washington-Districts der Deutschen Evang.-Luth. Synode von Missouri, Ohio und Andern Staaten (1900–1919) - Google Books

Lutheran Church–Missouri Synod districts
Lutheranism in Alaska
Lutheranism in Idaho
Lutheranism in Oregon
Lutheranism in Washington (state)
Religious organizations established in 1899
Lutheran districts established in the 19th century
Religion in the Pacific Northwest